The 1959 NBA playoffs was the postseason tournament of the National Basketball Association's 1958-59 season. The tournament concluded with the Eastern Division champion Boston Celtics defeating the Western Division champion Minneapolis Lakers 4 games to 0 in the NBA Finals. It was the Celtics' second NBA championship.

This was the first NBA Finals matchup between the Lakers and Celtics; as of 2020, they have met in the Finals 12 times. Boston won the first eight NBA Finals series of the rivalry, spanning 3 decades – the 1950s, 1960s and 1980s – before the Lakers finally defeated Boston for the title in 1985 and again in 1987. Boston again topped the Lakers in 2008, but the Lakers gained revenge in 2010. 
This was the only Celtics/Lakers NBA Finals series that took place while the Lakers were based in Minneapolis, Minnesota. They remained in Minneapolis one more year before moving to their current home of Los Angeles, California.

Bracket

Division Semifinals

Eastern Division Semifinals

(2) New York Knicks vs. (3) Syracuse Nationals

This was the fifth playoff meeting between these two teams, with both teams splitting the first four meetings.

Western Division Semifinals

(2) Minneapolis Lakers vs. (3) Detroit Pistons

This was the sixth playoff meeting between these two teams, with the Lakers winning four of the first five meetings while the Pistons were based in Fort Wayne.

Division Finals

Eastern Division Finals

(1) Boston Celtics vs. (3) Syracuse Nationals

This was the seventh playoff meeting between these two teams, with the Nationals winning four of the first six meetings.

Western Division Finals

(1) St. Louis Hawks vs. (2) Minneapolis Lakers

This was the third playoff meeting between these two teams, with the Hawks winning the first two meetings.

NBA Finals: (E1) Boston Celtics vs. (W2) Minneapolis Lakers

 Vern Mikkelsen’s final NBA game.

This was the first playoff meeting between these two teams.

References

External links
Basketball-Reference.com's 1959 NBA Playoffs page

National Basketball Association playoffs
Playoffs

fi:NBA-kausi 1958–1959#Pudotuspelit